Bryan Calhoun is vice president of New Media and External Affairs at SoundExchange.

A speaker and panelist at industry events, he holds a position on the boards of Future of Music Coalition, and the University of Georgia Music Business Program.

Recently Calhoun was featured as the cover story for University of Georgia's Terry Website and Magazine (Fall 2009).

References

Living people
Year of birth missing (living people)
American businesspeople